Zero population growth may refer to:
 Zero population growth, demographic balance (stable population size)
 Zero Population Growth, former name of the organisation Population Connection
 Z.P.G., a 1972 Danish-American dystopian science fiction film
 Zero Population Growth: Bliss Out Volume 15, a music album

See also 
 ZPG (disambiguation)